FOXF1 adjacent non-coding developmental regulatory RNA is a long non-coding RNA that in humans is encoded by the FENDRR gene.

Function

This gene produces a spliced long non-coding RNA transcribed bidirectionally with FOXF1 on the opposite strand. A similar gene in mouse is essential for normal development of the heart and body wall. The encoded transcript is thought to act by binding to polycomb repressive complex 2 (PRC2) and/or TrxG/MLL complexes to promote the methylation of the promoters of target genes, thus reducing their expression. It has been suggested that this transcript may play a role in the progression of gastric cancer. Alternatively spliced transcript variants have been identified.

References

Further reading